The Nokia 6270 is a late 2005 quad band mobile phone from Nokia. It is based on the Series 40 third generation platform, and features a 2 megapixel digital camera with 5x digital zoom and a flash, 9 MB of storage plus support for up to a 2 GB miniSD Card, and a 240x320 QVGA screen with 262,144 colors. Software includes a full XHTML compatible web browser, an email client and a media player (mp3 and mp4 supported). 

The phone has a good connectivity as it features Bluetooth, EDGE, Pop-Port and infrared and is also USB compatible for synchronising with your home PC. 

Along with the music player with  MP3 and AAC support, it also has a built-in radio receiver, which is used through the headset supplied. The phone features stereo speakers with 3D sound effects, a new technology which makes the sound more realistic and is now embedded in many of the latest high-class phones. 

It also has active standby, which displays daily activities and meetings on the phone's idle display.

Next in the phone line is the Nokia 6280, a 3G version of the Nokia 6270. It was succeeded by the Nokia E65 and the Nokia 6500 slide which were released in 2007.

References

External links
Nokia 6270 - Official Nokia webpage.

6270
Mobile phones introduced in 2005
Mobile phones with infrared transmitter
Slider phones